Artemida (Greek, Αρτέμιδα; formerly called Koumouthekra, Κουμουθέκρα) is a village near Zacharo in southern Elis in the western part of the Peloponnese peninsula of Greece. The village was completely destroyed in the 2007 Greek forest fires. Twenty-three residents of Artemida lost their lives.

On August 30, 2007, the Government of Cyprus announced that it will completely reconstruct the village and cover the complete cost of doing so.

References

Populated places in Elis
Zacharo